Old Agency is a census-designated place (CDP) in Sanders County, Montana, United States. The population was 95 at the 2000 census.

Geography
Old Agency is located at  (47.323309, -114.297795).

Demographics

As of the census of 2000, there were 95 people, 31 households, and 23 families residing in the CDP. The population density was 161.8 people per square mile (62.2/km). There were 39 housing units at an average density of 66.4/sq mi (25.5/km). The racial makeup of the CDP was 15.79% White, 78.95% Native American, and 5.26% from two or more races. Hispanic or Latino of any race were 1.05% of the population.

There were 31 households, out of which 51.6% had children under the age of 18 living with them, 35.5% were married couples living together, 19.4% had a female householder with no husband present, and 25.8% were non-families. 19.4% of all households were made up of individuals, and 3.2% had someone living alone who was 65 years of age or older. The average household size was 3.06 and the average family size was 3.57.

In the CDP, the population was spread out, with 36.8% under the age of 18, 13.7% from 18 to 24, 32.6% from 25 to 44, 9.5% from 45 to 64, and 7.4% who were 65 years of age or older. The median age was 24 years. For every 100 females, there were 102.1 males. For every 100 females age 18 and over, there were 106.9 males.

The median income for a household in the CDP was $18,750, and the median income for a family was $22,917. Males had a median income of $22,250 versus $11,250 for females. The per capita income for the CDP was $7,623. There were 48.4% of families and 53.2% of the population living below the poverty line, including 55.6% of under eighteens and 50.0% of those over 64.

References

Census-designated places in Sanders County, Montana
Census-designated places in Montana